Hannah Montana Forever may refer to:

 Hannah Montana (season 4), which was marketed as Hannah Montana Forever
 Hannah Montana Forever (soundtrack), the soundtrack for the fourth season